Yarra Scenic Drive is a tourist drive following the Yarra River, in Victoria, Australia. The route traverses approximately 60 km from Williamstown - where the Yarra empties into Port Phillip Bay - to Warrandyte - Melbourne's first goldfield site on the banks of the Yarra.

Route

Warrandyte to Bulleen
Through these outer north-eastern suburbs, the route winds near to the Yarra River, but rarely can the driver see the river itself. The roads do, however, pass by a number of Yarraside parks, including Pound Bend, Westerfolds Park, Finns Reserve, Birrarung Park  and Banksia Park, which are all well-liked serene picnic locations with a view of the outer-suburban Yarra River, where it is still safe to swim and canoe.

Heidelberg to Alphington
There is little in the way of a Yarra view along this section of the drive. The best Yarra vantage point is found alongside the Boulevarde, but there are many stores and some industry through these middle-northern suburbs.

Yarra Boulevard, Kew
A winding but road on the edge of a hill which provides a marvellous view of both the Yarra and the inner suburbs. It also runs alongside several golf courses.

Burnley to Southbank
For most of this section, the road runs directly alongside the Yarra River after it widens past Dights Falls, with a clean view of the bridges and surroundings. Alexandra Avenue also provides access to the Royal Botanic Gardens and Birrarung Marr. Alexandra Avenue, however, is an important thoroughfare in inner-eastern Melbourne, and so traffic can often be unpleasant.

City
Route 2 briefly takes in the CBD, driving directly past Crown Casino  and the Melbourne Aquarium.

West Gate Bridge
The famous West Gate Bridge  spans the Yarra at its widest, and gives a panoramic view of the city, the docks, the industrial western suburbs, and Port Phillip Bay. Traffic is chaotic during peak hour.

Yarraville to Williamstown
This is a drive along the inner-western beachfront to the end of the mini-peninsula at Williamstown, finishing the route alongside a scenery of blue skies, yellow sand and marinas - a far cry from the leafy green beginnings of Warrandyte. This section coincides with the newer Bay West Trail, signed as Tourist Route 11.

History

The drive was originally signed as Metropolitan Route 2 in 1965, and was signed accordingly with the standard blue and white curved shield signs. When the route was extended from Ivanhoe East to Warrandyte, it was re-signed using the brown five-sided shield in 1989, usually shown in the centre of a small green and white sign bearing the words Yarra Scenic Drive.

Major intersections

References

See also

Streets in Melbourne
Roads in Victoria (Australia)
Scenic routes in Australia